In Greek mythology, Soteria was the goddess or spirit (daimon) of safety and salvation, deliverance, and preservation from harm (not to be mistaken for Eleos). Soteria was also an epithet of the goddesses Persephone and Hecate, meaning deliverance and safety.

Soteria's male counterpart was the spirit or daimon Soter.  Both Zeus and Dionysus were titled Soter, so either may have been her father; her mother is unknown.

She had a sanctuary and a statue made in her honor in the town of Patrae, which was believed to have been founded by Eurypylos of Thessaly. Various texts mention the creation of her sanctuary, for example:
 Pausanias, Description of Greece 7. 24. 3 (trans. Jones) (Greek travelogue 2nd century AD): "[In Aigion in Akhaia (Aegium in Achaea)] they also have a sanctuary of Soteria (Safety). Her image may be seen by none but the priests, and the following ritual is performed. They take cakes of the district from the goddess and throw them into the sea, saying that they send them to Arethousa at Syrakousa (Syracuse)."
 Pausanias, Description of Greece 7. 19. 7 & 21. 7: "Eurypylos [the hero of the Trojan War] opened the chest [containing a sacred idol of Dionysos], saw the image, and forthwith on seeing it went mad. He continued to be insane for the greater part of the time, with rare lucid intervals ... There is a sanctuary [in Patrai in Akhaia (Patrae in Achaea)] with an image of stone. It is called the sanctuary of Soteria (Deliverance), and the story is that it was originally founded by Eurypylos on being cured of his madness."
 Ovid, Fasti 3. 879 ff (trans. Boyle) (Roman poetry 1st century BC to 1st century AD): "March 30 Comitialis. When the shepherd feeds and pens his kids four more times and the grasslands whiten with four fresh dews, Janus should be worshipped and gentle Concordia (Concord), Salus Romana (Safety of Rome) and the Ara Pacis (Altar of Peace)."

Soteria was depicted as a woman wearing a laurel wreath crown, a symbol of victory.

In Roman mythology, Soteria is known as Salus (Preservation); however, Salus's domain more heavily featured physical well-being and health rather than security and safety.  The Bible's use of Soteria indicates its etymology from Greek mythology, as the word is used to mean "fourfold salvation: saved from the penalty, power, presence and most importantly the pleasure of sin."

See also

 (Goddesses of Justice):  Astraea, Dike, Themis, Prudentia
 (Goddesses of Injustice):  Adikia
 (Aspects of Justice):  (see also: Triple deity/Triple Goddess (neopaganism))
 (Justice) Themis/Dike/Justitia (Lady Justice), Raguel (the Angel of Justice)
 (Retribution) Nemesis/Rhamnousia/Rhamnusia/Adrasteia/Adrestia/Invidia
 (Redemption) Eleos/Soteria/Clementia, Zadkiel/Zachariel (the Angel of Mercy)

Notes

Greek goddesses
Personifications in Greek mythology
Epithets of Persephone
Daimons
Savior goddesses
Children of Zeus
Children of Dionysus
Patras